John Wilkinson may refer to:

Politicians
 John Denison (MP) (John Wilkinson, c. 1758–1820), British MP for Wootton Bassett 1796–1802, for Colchester 1802–1806, and for Minehead 1807–1812
 John Alexander Wilkinson (1789–1862), judge and political figure in Upper Canada
 John Wilkinson (Florida politician) (1848–1891), state legislator during the Reconstruction era
 John Wilkinson (Australian politician) (1853–?), Member of the New South Wales Legislative Assembly 1889–1895
 John Wilkinson (British politician) (1940–2014), Conservative Party
 John Wilkinson (Canadian politician) (active since 1999), Canadian politician from Ontario
 John Wilkinson (Georgia politician) (born 1955), state senator from Georgia (U.S. state)

Sports
 John Wilkinson (Gloucestershire cricketer) (1876–1948), English cricketer
 John Wilkinson (Scottish footballer) (1886–1918), Scottish footballer
 John Wilkinson (footballer, born 1887), English footballer for Manchester City
 John Wilkinson (Worcestershire cricketer) (1892–1967), English cricketer
 John Wilkinson (Watford footballer) (active 1921–1924), English footballer of the 1920s
 John Wilkinson (ice hockey) (1911–1970), Canadian professional ice hockey player
 John Wilkinson (footballer, born 1949) (1949–2007), English footballer
 John Wilkinson (footballer, born 1979), Singaporean/British footballer playing in the S.League
 John Wilkinson (football manager), manager of Grantham Town F.C. from 1999 to 2003

Others
 John Wilkinson (President of Magdalen) (1588–1650), English churchman and academic
 John Wilkinson (industrialist) (1728–1808), British industrialist who suggested the use of iron for many roles
 John Wilkinson (1780–1796), American colonist, first son of James Wilkinson
 John Gardner Wilkinson (1797–1875), English traveller, writer and pioneer Egyptologist
 John Wilkinson (Syracuse pioneer) (1798–1862), lawyer and first postmaster, named the Syracuse city, son of the colonist
 John Wilkinson (CSN) (1821–1891), officer in the Confederate States Navy, commanded CSS Chickamauga
 John F. N. Wilkinson (1832–1912), American librarian
 John Grimshaw Wilkinson (1856–1937), British botanist
 John Wilkinson (Franklin automobile) (1868–1951), invented the Franklin automobile air-cooled engine, grandchild of the Syracuse pioneer
 John Frederick Wilkinson (1897–1998), British physician and medical researcher
 John Wilkinson (sound engineer) (1920–2002), American sound engineer and Academy Award winner
 John Donald Wilkinson (1929–2018), Anglican priest and Bible scholar
 John C. Wilkinson (active since 1964), academic scholar on Islamic studies
 John Wilkinson (entrepreneur) (active 1982–2013), British steel businessman and chairman of Salford City Reds Rugby League Club
 John Wilkinson (guitarist) (1945–2013), American rhythm guitarist with Elvis Presley's TCB Band
 John Wilkinson (poet) (born 1953), British poet
 John Wilkinson (chemist) (born 1961), introduced the first degree (BSc) course in herbal medicine in the UK

See also
Jack Wilkinson (disambiguation)
Jonny Wilkinson (born 1979), English rugby union player